The Red Bank Borough Public Schools are part of a community public school district that serves students in pre-kindergarten through eighth grade from Red Bank, in Monmouth County, New Jersey, United States.

As of the 2018–19 school year, the district, comprising two schools, had an enrollment of 1,434 students and 110.0 classroom teachers (on an FTE basis), for a student–teacher ratio of 13.0:1.

The district is classified by the New Jersey Department of Education as being in District Factor Group "CD", the sixth-highest of eight groupings. District Factor Groups organize districts statewide to allow comparison by common socioeconomic characteristics of the local districts. From lowest socioeconomic status to highest, the categories are A, B, CD, DE, FG, GH, I and J.

For grades nine through twelve, public school students attend Red Bank Regional High School, which also serves students from Little Silver and Shrewsbury Borough, along with students in the district's academy programs from other communities who are eligible to attend on a tuition basis. Students from other Monmouth County municipalities are eligible to attend the high school for its performing arts program, with admission on a competitive basis. The borough has five elected representatives on the nine-member Board of Education. As of the 2018–19 school year, the high school had an enrollment of 1,208 students and 119.6 classroom teachers (on an FTE basis), for a student–teacher ratio of 10.1:1.

Schools 
Schools in the district (with 2018–19 enrollment data from the National Center for Education Statistics) are:
Elementary school
Red Bank Primary School with 644 students in pre-kindergarten through fourth grade
Maria Iozzi, Principal
Dena Russo, Vice Principal 
Middle School
Red Bank Middle School with 648 students in fourth through eighth grades
James Pierson, Principal
Maura Harrington, Vice Principal

Administration
Core members of the district's administration are:
Jared J. Rumage, Superintendent
Eileen Gorga, Business Administrator / Board Secretary

Board of education
The district's board of education, with nine members, sets policy and oversees the fiscal and educational operation of the district through its administration. As a Type II school district, the board's trustees are elected directly by voters to serve three-year terms of office on a staggered basis, with three seats up for election each year held (since 2012) as part of the November general election.

References

External links
Red Bank Borough Public Schools

School Data for the Red Bank Borough Public Schools, National Center for Education Statistics
Red Bank Regional High School

School Data for the Red Bank Regional High School, National Center for Education Statistics

Red Bank, New Jersey
New Jersey District Factor Group CD
School districts in Monmouth County, New Jersey